is a role-playing video game for the Family Computer produced by Sigma Ent. Inc., and released in Japan on December 22, 1990.

The game is inspired by the legendary Japanese figure Miyamoto Musashi and is an RPG in the vein of Dragon Quest. The player only controls Musashi, son of Miyamoto Musashi, although a computer-controlled partner assists in battle.

There is a fan translation patch available for this game which allows it to be played in English.

See also
Miyamoto Musashi in fiction

References

External links
RPGClassics Shrine
 Superfluous Gamer

1990 video games
Japan-exclusive video games
Nintendo Entertainment System games
Nintendo Entertainment System-only games
Quest Corporation games
Role-playing video games
Video games developed in Japan
Video games scored by Masaharu Iwata
Cultural depictions of Miyamoto Musashi